William Hobby may refer to:

William M. Hobby (1899–1942), United States Navy officer killed in action during World War II for whom a U.S. Navy ship was named
William P. Hobby (1878–1964), American publisher and politician
William P. Hobby Jr. (born 1932), his son, American publisher and politician